Dinero is the Spanish word for money, derived from the Latin denarius. 

Dinero may refer to:

Dinero (cache simulator), a trace-driven uniprocessor cache simulator
Dinero (magazine), a Colombian financial magazine
"Dinero" (Jennifer Lopez song), released in 2018
"Dinero" (Trinidad Cardona song), released in 2018
"Dinero", a song by Bad Gyal from Slow Wine Mixtape
Dinero, Texas, an unincorporated community in eastern Live Oak County, Texas
Monte Dinero, a town in Patagonia, Santa Cruz Province, Argentina
Spanish dinero, an obsolete Spanish currency